The 2007 Queensland Cup season was the 12th season of Queensland's top-level statewide rugby league competition run by the Queensland Rugby League. The competition, known as the Queensland Wizard Cup due to sponsorship from Wizard Home Loans featured 11 teams playing a 26-week long season (including finals) from March to September.

The Tweed Heads Seagulls became the first team from outside of Queensland to win the Queensland Cup when they defeated the Redcliffe Dolphins 28–18 at Suncorp Stadium. Tweed Heads'  Shannon Walker was named the competition's Player of the Year, winning the Courier Mail Medal.

Teams 
11 teams participated in the Queensland Cup again in 2007, with the Aspley Broncos replacing the Toowoomba Clydesdales.

Ladder

Finals series

Grand Final 

Reigning premiers Redcliffe, who finished the regular season in 2nd, were the first team to qualify for the Grand Final after defeating Tweed Heads in Week 1 and North Queensland in the major semi final. It would be their nine Grand Final appearance in 12 seasons. After losing to Redcliffe, Tweed Heads faced Ipswich in an elimination final, which they won 40–14. A week later, they scored a major upset over minor premiers North Queensland to progress to their first Queensland Cup Grand Final appearance.

First half 
Redcliffe opened their premiership defence strongly when halfback Chris Fox scored in the ninth minute. Tweed Heads hit back in the 18th minute when David Myles latched onto a Tim Maccan grubber to score. The Seagulls moved into the lead for the first time when captain Brad Davis stepped through some soft defence to score under the posts. Tweed Heads extended their lead to 12 just seconds before half time when Davis sent Myles over for his second try of the game.

Second half 
The Dolphins got the scoring underway in the second half when centre Nick Emmett dived onto a kick from his winger Alwyn Simpson to get Redcliffe back into the contest. 10 minutes later, Tweed Heads pushed the lead back to 12 when the competition's Player of the Year Shannon Walker backed up a Maccan line break to score. Walker sealed the game for his side just five minutes later when he returned a Dolphins' kick 80 metres to score in the corner. Redcliffe gave themselves a small chance late when winger Rory Bromley crossed in the 74th minute but it wasn't enough as Tweed Heads won their first premiership. They became the first club from outside of Queensland to win the competition.

Seagulls' captain Brad Davis was named Man of the Match and awarded the first ever Duncan Hall Medal, named in honour of the Hall of Famer, who played 24 games for Queensland and 22 Tests for Australia.

The loss in the Grand Final would effectively end the Redcliffe Dolphins dominant run in the Queensland Cup. From 1996 to 2007, the club won five premierships, appeared in nine of 12 Grand Finals and won three minor premierships. They would not qualify for another Grand Final until 2012 and would not win another until 2018.

End-of-season awards 

 Courier Mail Medal (Best and Fairest): Shannon Walker ( Tweed Heads Seagulls)
 QANTAS Player of the Year (Coaches Award): Trent Young ( Easts Tigers)
 Coach of the Year: Anthony Griffin ( Redcliffe Dolphins)
 Rookie of the Year: Shannon Walker ( Tweed Heads Seagulls)
 Representative Player of the Year: Shane Muspratt ( Queensland Residents,  North Queensland Young Guns)

See also 

 Queensland Cup
 Queensland Rugby League

References 

2007 in Australian rugby league
Queensland Cup